The 2012 Los Angeles Angels of Anaheim season was the franchise's 52nd season and 47th in Anaheim (all of them at Angel Stadium of Anaheim). The Angels would miss the playoffs for the 3rd straight season, finishing third in the AL West at 89-73.

2011–12 offseason

Front office and business
The day after the end of the 2011 regular season, the Angels vowed to be "creative" and "aggressive" in their approach to the upcoming offseason because of the team missing out on the postseason two years in a row for the first time since 2000–01. Just a day after that statement, the Angels announced that general manager Tony Reagins had resigned with owner Arte Moreno saying that "we felt a change was needed", Reagins will remain part of the front office in a different capacity. On October 27, 2011, it was reported that the Angels will hire Jerry Dipoto to serve as the franchise's eleventh general manager, there will be an official announcement by the Angels on October 28. The Angels also signed a major new television deal with Fox Sports worth $3 billion over a span of 20 years which works out to $150 million a year. It is the new TV deal, that many speculate, enabled the Angels to spend so much in the 2011–12 offseason.

Albert Pujols and C. J. Wilson

On December 8, 2011, the Angels shocked the baseball world by signing former St. Louis Cardinals star Albert Pujols and Texas Rangers ace C. J. Wilson spending up to $331 million on the two players. According to analysts, Pujols was regarded as the best offensive player (along with arguably being the best player of this generation) and Wilson being the best pitcher on the market. Pujols had been a mainstay in the St. Louis Cardinals organization for 11 years prior to the signing and the Angels reportedly came into the negotiations at the last minute to sign the prized free agent. All media speculation prior to Dec 8 surrounding Pujols was centered around the Cardinals and Miami Marlins, while not as much as the Marlins, the Angels reported offer of $254 million over 10 years was much more than the reported offer by the Cardinals and had a full no-trade clause. As for C. J. Wilson, analysts predicted that the Angels would go after him, and while the Marlins offered him more money and a longer contract term, the Orange County native opted to return home and play for the Angels for a reported $77.5 million over 5 years. The two prize signings were introduced to the Southern California media and fans on December 10 in front of the two large hats at Angel Stadium. Because the press conference was outdoors and in front of the stadium, fans were encouraged to attend and anywhere between 3,000 and 5,000 fans attended to get a glimpse of the two new Angels. Also, within just a few days of the signings, the Angels reportedly sold over 1,000 new season ticket packages, 500 online subscriptions, and a large spike in merchandise sales at the Angels team store in Anaheim.

Other transactions
One of the first moves made by new general manager Jerry Dipoto was to acquire former Rockies catcher Chris Iannetta for pitcher Tyler Chatwood and sending former Angels catcher Jeff Mathis to Toronto in order to make room at the catching position for Iannetta. On December 7, the Angels signed veteran reliever LaTroy Hawkins a fact that was somewhat overshadowed by the Pujols and Wilson signings just a day later. Later, on December 12, the Angels announced that all eligible players will be tendered a contract, including Kendrys Morales, the slugger who has not played since his breaking his leg early in the 2010 season. The Angels also re-signed pitcher Jerome Williams to a one-year deal. The Angels gave 2B Howie Kendrick a 4-year $33 million deal They also released OF Chris Pettit and signed Francisco Rodriguez (Angels) to a $2 million deal.

Spring training

The Cactus League slate of games for the Angels began on Monday 1, March on the road against Oakland, a 9–1 Angels victory. Their first home game at Tempe Diablo Stadium was a 6–2 win on Tuesday, March 6 against the Chicago White Sox.

Spring training notes
The 2012 season marks the Angels 20th season at Tempe Diablo Stadium in Tempe, Arizona and the 7th season since the venue's massive renovations were completed in 2006.

The Angels came into the Spring with high expectations for the following 2012 campaign due to the large amount of money spent by owner Arte Moreno in the offseason signing slugger Albert Pujols and lefty C. J. Wilson. Both prized acquisitions played in the Angels first spring game against the Athletics and the two did not disappoint: Pujols went 2 for three with 1 run scored and 1 run batted in while Wilson threw 2 complete innings with no runs and giving up only one hit. Because of the high expectations for the Angels in 2012, the Angels are expecting larger than usual crowds in Tempe this spring. One of the biggest questions surrounding the Angels franchise going into the Spring training was whether or not Kendrys Morales would make a comeback from breaking his ankle in 2010. Morales played in his first baseball game in nearly two years on March 16, 2012 in a minor league game and played in his first major league game of any kind on March 22. In that game, Morales went two for three with a run scored and was described by Angels personnel and Morales as a large step forward for the slugger. On March 23, in a split squad game against the Cleveland Indians in Goodyear, Morales again went two for three with a run scored in only his second game of the spring, but this time with his first home run since the 2010 regular season. According to the Angels radio broadcaster Terry Smith, the Angels have already sold out six home games at Tempe Diablo Stadium. The first sell-out crowd of the spring was for an Angels loss to the San Diego Padres on March 9. The Angels finished their spring training slate of games on April 4, 2012 with a record of 19–12–2, good for 3rd place in the Cactus League in terms of win percentage and 2nd in terms of number of wins (19). The average attendance at Tempe Diablo Stadium was 8,675 (total of 130,126) which was an average of 90.76% capacity. The Angels also sold out 9 of their 15 home Cactus League games.

Regular season
See the game log below for detailed game-by-game regular season information.

The season for the Angels began on Friday, April 6 at home against Kansas City.  Their first road game was on Monday, April 9 at Minnesota.  Their longest homestand was between July 20–29 (10 home games), and their longest road trip was May 18–27 and July 30 – August 8 (10 road games).  Their final game of the regular season was on Wednesday, October 3 on the road against Seattle.

Notable dates

April
April 6–8: Opening series at home against the Kansas City Royals. Despite winning the opening game of the series and season, the Angels would go on to lose the series two games to one.

Opening Day lineup:
1. Erick Aybar (SS)
2. Howie Kendrick (2B)
3. Albert Pujols (1B)
4. Torii Hunter (RF)
5. Vernon Wells (LF)
6. Kendrys Morales (DH)
7. Mark Trumbo (3B)
8. Chris Iannetta (C)
9. Peter Bourjos (CF)
P. Jered Weaver (RHP)
April 16–19: First series against an AL West division opponent, the series will take place against the Oakland Athletics at Angel Stadium. The Athletics took the series, three games to one.
April 20–22: The Angels defeated the then-AL East leading Baltimore Orioles two games to one to capture their first series win of the 2012 campaign.

May
April 30 – May 2: The Angels win their second series of the 2012 campaign in a sweep over the visiting Minnesota Twins. In the final game of the series, Angels pitcher Jered Weaver threw the franchise's tenth no-hitter in a 9-0 shutout victory.
May 11–13: First series against the defending AL West and American League champion Texas Rangers, it will take place in Arlington, Texas. The Halos ended up falling to the defending AL champions, two games to one.
May 18: Interleague play will begin for the Angels against the San Diego Padres at Petco Park. While the Padres ended up winning the series two games to one, the Angels continued their recent success over the National League by finishing interleague play with a record of 12–6, which was good for the third best interleague record in the Major Leagues only behind the Rangers and Yankees.
May 22–29: The Angels went on an eight-game winning streak by teaching two of three from Oakland, sweeping Seattle in a four game set, and winning the first two games in a three game series against the visiting Yankees. During the eight game win streak, the Angels went above the .500 mark for the first time since opening day.

June
June 11–13: The Angels faced the cross-town rival Dodgers in Los Angeles. The Angels would go on to win the series two games to one. During the first game of the series, the crowd at Dodger Stadium cheered upon hearing that the Los Angeles Kings beat the New Jersey Devils 6–1 to win the Stanley Cup in Game 6 of the Finals.
June 18–20: The San Francisco Giants visited Angel Stadium for the first time since the 2002 World Series and the result was not much different: the Angels won the series two games to one.
June 22–24: The Freeway Series resumed in Anaheim. The Angels went on to win the series two games to one and the season series four games to two. The Angels also improved their all-time record against the Dodgers to 54–38, and Angels manager (and former Dodgers catcher) Mike Scioscia's record over his former team to 49–29.
June 26: The Angels took sole control of a playoff berth (the second wild card spot) for the first time in the 2012 campaign after defeating the Baltimore Orioles in a 7–3 decision.

July
July 8: The Angels end the "first half" of the season a season-high 10 games over the .500 mark after defeating the Baltimore Orioles 6–0. Los Angeles was also in control of the first wild card spot and extended their lead to 2½ games over the very same Orioles.
July 9: 2012 Major League Baseball Home Run Derby. Angels slugger Mark Trumbo participated in the derby at Kauffman Stadium in Kansas City, he ended up finishing third behind champion Prince Fielder and runner-up José Bautista.
July 10: 2012 Major League Baseball All-Star Game. The National League won their third All-Star game in a row and secured home field advantage for the National League champion in the World Series. Four Angels were featured at the mid-summer classic: Mike Trout, Mark Trumbo, Jered Weaver, and C. J. Wilson. Reliever Ernesto Frieri was up for the last spot on the American League roster in the final vote, but he ended up falling to Texas pitcher Yu Darvish. Three of the four Angels made it into the game with Weaver pitching a scoreless frame in the top of the fifth inning and Trout going 1-1 with a walk. Wilson was unable to pitch in the game due to injury.
July 20–22: After stumbling out of the All-Star break losing two series against New York and Detroit, the Angels came home and promptly took two of three from the division leading Texas Rangers. By virtue of the series win, Los Angeles was able to gain some ground on the Rangers and after the series they sat five games out of first in the American League West.
July 27: The Angels acquired Zack Greinke from the Milwaukee Brewers on July 27 for rookie infielder Jean Segura and minor league pitchers Ariel Peña and John Hellweg. Greinke made his Angel debut against the Tampa Bay Rays on July 29, and despite a good outing, he suffered the loss in a 2–0 Rays win.

September
September 28–30: Final home series of the regular season, the Angels will face the division rival Seattle Mariners.

October
October 1–3: Final series of the regular season.

Schedule and results

Regular season

|- align="center" bgcolor="#bbffbb"
| 1 || April 6 || Royals || 5–0 || Weaver (1–0) || Crow (0–1) ||  || 44,106 || 1–0 || Angel Stadium of Anaheim || W1 || bgcolor="f2f2f2" | 0
|- align="center" bgcolor="ffbbbb"
| 2 || April 7 || Royals || 6–3 || Hochevar (1–0) || Haren (0–1) ||  ||  40,022 || 1–1 || Angel Stadium of Anaheim || L1 || bgcolor="ffbbbb" | -1
|- align="center" bgcolor="ffbbbb"
| 3 || April 8 || Royals || 7–3 || Sánchez (1–0) || Santana (0–1) || Broxton (1) || 32,227 || 1–2 || Angel Stadium of Anaheim || L2 || bgcolor="ffbbbb" | -1½
|- align="center" bgcolor="#bbffbb"
| 4 || April 9 || @ Twins || 5–1 || Wilson (1–0) || Blackburn (0–1) || || 39,414 || 2–2 || Target Field || W1 || bgcolor="ffbbbb" | -1
|- align="center" bgcolor="ffbbbb"
| 5 || April 11 || @ Twins || 6–5 || Gray (1–0) || Takahashi (0–1) || Capps (1) || 31,413 || 2–3 || Target Field || L1 || bgcolor="ffbbbb" | -1½
|- align="center" bgcolor="ffbbbb"
| 6 || April 12 || @ Twins || 10–9 || Gray (2–0) || Thompson (0–1) || Capps (2) || 31,782 || 2–4 || Target Field || L2 || bgcolor="ffbbbb" | -2½
|- align="center" bgcolor="ffbbbb"
| 7 || April 13 || @ Yankees || 5–0 || Kuroda (1–1) ||| Santana (0–2) || || 49,386 || 2–5 || Yankee Stadium || L3 || bgcolor="ffbbbb" | -3½
|- align="center" bgcolor="#bbffbb"
| 8 || April 14 || @ Yankees || 7–1 || Wilson (2–0) || Hughes (0–2) || || 46,829 || 3–5 || Yankee Stadium || W1 || bgcolor="ffbbbb" | -3½
|- align="center" bgcolor="ffbbbb"
| 9 || April 15 || @ Yankees || 11–5 || Nova (2–0) || Williams (0–1) || || 41,055 || 3–6 || Yankee Stadium || L1 || bgcolor="ffbbbb" | -4½
|- align="center" bgcolor="#bbffbb"
| 10 || April 16 || Athletics || 6–0 || Weaver (2–0) || McCarthy (0–2) || || 27,338 || 4–6 || Angel Stadium of Anaheim || W1 || bgcolor="ffbbbb" | -4½
|- align="center" bgcolor="ffbbbb"
| 11 || April 17 || Athletics || 5–3 || Fuentes (1–0) || Jepsen (0–1) || Balfour (3) || 41,016 || 4–7 || Angel Stadium of Anaheim || L1 || bgcolor="ffbbbb" | -5
|- align="center" bgcolor="ffbbbb"
| 12 || April 18 || Athletics || 6–0 || Colón (3–1) || Santana (0–3) || || 27,217 || 4–8 || Angel Stadium of Anaheim || L2 || bgcolor="ffbbbb" | -6
|- align="center" bgcolor="ffbbbb"
| 13 || April 19 || Athletics || 4–2 || Milone (2–1) || Wilson (2–1) || Balfour (4) || 27,864 || 4–9 || Angel Stadium of Anaheim || L3 || bgcolor="ffbbbb" | -7
|- align="center" bgcolor="#bbffbb"
| 14 || April 20 || Orioles || 6–3 || Williams (1–1) || Matusz (0–3) || Walden (1) || 32,272 || 5–9 || Angel Stadium of Anaheim || W1 || bgcolor="ffbbbb" | -6½
|- align="center" bgcolor="#bbffbb"
| 15 || April 21 || Orioles || 6–3 || Weaver (3–0) || Arrieta (1–1) || || 38,054 || 6–9 || Angel Stadium of Anaheim || W2 || bgcolor="ffbbbb" | -6
|- align="center" bgcolor="ffbbbb"
| 16 || April 22 || Orioles || 3–2 (10) || Strop (2–1) || Hawkins (0–1) || Johnson (7) || 38,221 || 6–10 || Angel Stadium of Anaheim || L1 || bgcolor="ffbbbb" | -7
|- align="center" bgcolor="ffbbbb"
| 17 || April 24 || @ Rays || 5–0 || Price (3–1) || Santana (0–4) || || 14,933 || 6–11 || Tropicana Field || L2 || bgcolor="ffbbbb" | -7½
|- align="center" bgcolor="ffbbbb"
| 18 || April 25 || @ Rays || 3–2 || Hellickson (3–0) || Wilson (2–2) || Rodney (6) || 14,638 || 6–12 || Tropicana Field || L3 || bgcolor="ffbbbb" | -8½
|- align="center" bgcolor="ffbbbb"
| 19 || April 26 || @ Rays || 4–3 || Gomes (1–1) || Walden (0–1) || || 15,417 || 6–13 || Tropicana Field || L4 || bgcolor="ffbbbb" | -9
|- align="center" bgcolor="ffbbbb"
| 20 || April 27 || @ Indians || 3–2 || Pestano (1–0) || Carpenter (0–1) || || 12,597 || 6–14 || Progressive Field || L5 || bgcolor="ffbbbb" | -9
|- align="center" bgcolor="#bbffbb"
| 21 || April 28 || @ Indians || 2–1 || Haren (1–1) || Gómez (1–1) || Downs (1) || 11,316 || 7–14 || Progressive Field || W1 || bgcolor="ffbbbb" | -9
|- align="center" bgcolor="ffbbbb"
| 22 || April 29 || @ Indians || 4–0 || Lowe (4–1) || Santana (0–5) || || 15,421 || 7–15 || Progressive Field || L1 || bgcolor="ffbbbb" | -9
|- align="center" bgcolor="#bbffbb"
| 23 || April 30 || Twins || 4–3 || Wilson (3–2) || Blackburn (0–3) || Downs (2) || 27,027 || 8–15 || Angel Stadium of Anaheim || W1 || bgcolor="ffbbbb" | -9
|-

|- align="center" bgcolor="#bbffbb"
| 24 || May 1 || Twins || 4–0 || Williams (2–1) || Liriano (0–4) || || 30,039 || 9–15 || Angel Stadium of Anaheim ||W2 || bgcolor="ffbbbb" | -8
|- align="center" bgcolor="#bbffbb"
| 25 || May 2 || Twins || 9–0 || Weaver (4–0)* || Hendriks (0–2) || || 27,288 || 10–15 || Angel Stadium of Anaheim ||W3 || bgcolor="ffbbbb" | -7
|- align="center" bgcolor="ffbbbb"
| 26 || May 3 || Blue Jays || 5–0 || Morrow (3–1) || Haren (1–2) || || 28,359 || 10–16 || Angel Stadium of Anaheim || L1 || bgcolor="ffbbbb" | -7½
|- align="center" bgcolor="ffbbbb"
| 27 || May 4 || Blue Jays || 4–0 || Álvarez (2–2) || Santana (0–6) || || 33,160 || 10–17 || Angel Stadium of Anaheim || L2 || bgcolor="ffbbbb" | -7½
|- align="center" bgcolor="#bbffbb"
| 28 || May 5 || Blue Jays || 6–2 || Wilson (4–2) || Drabek (2–3) || ||  39,018 || 11–17 || Angel Stadium of Anaheim || W1 || bgcolor="ffbbbb" | -7½
|- align="center" bgcolor="#bbffbb"
| 29 || May 6 || Blue Jays || 4–3 || Williams (3–1) || Hutchison (1–1) || Hawkins (1) || 37,548 || 12–17 || Angel Stadium of Anaheim || W2 || bgcolor="ffbbbb" | -6½
|- bgcolor="#bbffbb"
| 30 || May 7 || @ Twins || 8–3 || Weaver (5–0) || Liriano (0–5) || || 31,382 || 13–17 || Target Field || W3 || bgcolor="ffbbbb" | -6½
|- align="center" bgcolor="ffbbbb" 
| 31 || May 8 || @ Twins || 5–0 || Diamond (1–0) || Haren (1–3) || || 30,776 || 13–18 || Target Field || L1 || bgcolor="ffbbbb" | -7½
|- align="center" bgcolor="#bbffbb" 
| 32 || May 9 || @ Twins || 6–2 || Santana (1–6) || Pavano (2–3) || || 31,915 || 14–18 || Target Field || W1 || bgcolor="ffbbbb" | -7
|- align="center" bgcolor="ffbbbb"
| 33 || May 11 || @ Rangers || 10–3 || Darvish (5–1) || Wilson (4–3) || || 48,201 || 14–19 || Rangers Ballpark in Arlington || L1 || bgcolor="ffbbbb" | -8
|- align="center" bgcolor="#bbffbb" 
| 34 || May 12 || @ Rangers || 4–2 || Carpenter (1–1) || Harrison (4–3) || Downs (3) || 47,699 || 15–19 || Rangers Ballpark in Arlington || W1 || bgcolor="ffbbbb" | -7
|- align="center" bgcolor="ffbbbb"
| 35 || May 13 || @ Rangers || 13–6 || Feliz (3–1) || Weaver (5–1) || || 46,669 || 15–20 || Rangers Ballpark in Arlington || L1 || bgcolor="ffbbbb" | -8
|- align="center" bgcolor="ffbbbb"
| 36 || May 14 || Athletics || 5–0 || Ross (2–3) || Haren (1–4) || || 32,851 || 15–21 || Angel Stadium of Anaheim || L2 || bgcolor="ffbbbb" | -8
|- align="center" bgcolor="#bbffbb"
| 37 || May 15 || Athletics || 4–0 || Santana (2–6) || Colón (3–4) || || 31,762 || 16–21 || Angel Stadium of Anaheim || W1 || bgcolor="ffbbbb" | -7
|- align="center" bgcolor="#bbffbb"
| 38 || May 16 || White Sox || 7–2 || Williams (4–1) || Floyd (3–4) || || 39,027 || 17–21 || Angel Stadium of Anaheim || W2 || bgcolor="ffbbbb" | -7
|- align="center" bgcolor="ffbbbb"
| 39 || May 17 || White Sox || 6–1 || Sale (4–2) || Wilson (4–4) || || 30,786 || 17–22 || Angel Stadium of Anaheim || L1 || bgcolor="ffbbbb" | -7
|- align="center" bgcolor="#bbffbb"
| 40 || May 18 || @ Padres || 7–2 || Weaver (6–1) || Suppan (2–2) || || 31,389 || 18–22 || Petco Park || W1 || bgcolor="ffbbbb" | -7
|- align="center" bgcolor="ffbbbb"
| 41 || May 19 || @ Padres || 3–2 || Gregerson (1–0) || Haren (1–5) || Thayer (5) || 43,427 || 18–23 || Petco Park || L1 || bgcolor="ffbbbb" | -7
|- align="center" bgcolor="ffbbbb"
| 42 || May 20 || @ Padres || 3–2 (13) || Mikolas (1–1) || Pauley (0–1) || || 33,975 || 18–24 || Petco Park || L2 || bgcolor="ffbbbb" | -8
|- align="center" bgcolor="ffbbbb" 
| 43 || May 21 || @ Athletics || 2–1 || Milone (6–3) || Williams (4–2) || Fuentes (4) || 11,292 || 18–25 || O.co Coliseum || L3 || bgcolor="ffbbbb" | -8
|- align="center" bgcolor="#bbffbb"
| 44 || May 22 || @ Athletics || 5–0 || Wilson (5–4) || Godfrey (0–4) || || 12,894 || 19–25 || O.co Coliseum || W1 || bgcolor="ffbbbb" | -8
|- align="center" bgcolor="#bbffbb"
| 45 || May 23 || @ Athletics || 3–1 (11) || Walden (1–1) || Norberto (0–1) || Frieri (1) || 23,617 || 20–25 || O.co Coliseum || W2 || bgcolor="ffbbbb" | -7
|- align="center" bgcolor="#bbffbb" 
| 46 || May 24 || @ Mariners || 3–0 || Haren (2–5) || Vargas (5–4) || || 18,048 || 21–25 || Safeco Field || W3 || bgcolor="ffbbbb" | -6½
|- align="center" bgcolor="#bbffbb" 
| 47 || May 25 || @ Mariners || 6–4 || Isringhausen (1–0) || League (0–4) || Downs (4) || 23,517 || 22–25 || Safeco Field || W4 || bgcolor="ffbbbb" | -6½
|- align="center" bgcolor="#bbffbb" 
| 48 || May 26 || @ Mariners || 5–3 || Williams (5–2) || Hernández (4–4) || Frieri (2) || 29,483 || 23–25 || Safeco Field || W5 || bgcolor="ffbbbb" | -6½
|- align="center" bgcolor="#bbffbb"
| 49 || May 27 || @ Mariners || 4–2 || Wilson (6–4) || Noesí (2–6) || Downs (5) || 24,467 || 24–25 || Safeco Field || W6 || bgcolor="ffbbbb" | -6½
|- align="center" bgcolor="#bbffbb"
| 50 || May 28 || Yankees || 9–8 || Walden (2–1) || Wade (0–1) || || 44,016 || 25–25 || Angel Stadium of Anaheim || W7 || bgcolor="ffbbbb" | -6½
|- align="center" bgcolor="#bbffbb"
| 51 || May 29 || Yankees || 5–1 || Haren (3–5) || Pettitte (2–2) || || 42,065 || 26–25 || Angel Stadium of Anaheim || W8 || bgcolor="ffbbbb" | -5½
|- align="center" bgcolor="ffbbbb" 
| 52 || May 30 || Yankees || 6–5 || Nova (6–2) || Takahashi (0–2) || Soriano (6) || 40,111 || 26–26 || Angel Stadium of Anaheim || L1 || bgcolor="ffbbbb" | -5½
|-
| colspan=12 | *Jered Weaver threw the tenth no-hitter in Angels history.
|-

|- align="center" bgcolor="#bbffbb"
| 53 || June 1 || Rangers || 4–2 || Williams (6–2) || Lewis (4–4) || Frieri (3) || 40,080 || 27–26 || Angel Stadium of Anaheim || W1 || bgcolor="ffbbbb" | -4½
|- align="center" bgcolor="#bbffbb"
| 54 || June 2 || Rangers || 3–2 || Cassevah (1–0) || Darvish (7–3) || Frieri (4) || 44,227 || 28–26 || Angel Stadium of Anaheim || W2 || bgcolor="ffbbbb" | -3½
|- align="center" bgcolor="ffbbbb" 
| 55 || June 3 || Rangers || 7–3 || Harrison (7–3) || Haren (3–6) || || 42,465 || 28–27 || Angel Stadium of Anaheim || L1 || bgcolor="ffbbbb" | -4½
|- align="center" bgcolor="ffbbbb" 
| 56 || June 4 || Mariners || 8–6 || Vargas (7–4) || Santana (2–7) || Wilhelmsen (1) || 36,079 || 28–28 || Angel Stadium of Anaheim || L2 || bgcolor="ffbbbb" | -4½
|- align="center" bgcolor="#bbffbb"
| 57 || June 5 || Mariners || 6–1 || Richards (1–0) || Beavan (3–5) || || 35,021 || 29–28 || Angel Stadium of Anaheim || W1 || bgcolor="ffbbbb" | -4½
|- align="center" bgcolor="ffbbbb"
| 58 || June 6 || Mariners || 8–6 || Kelley (1–2) || Williams (6–3) || Wilhelmsen (2) || 37,342 || 29–29 || Angel Stadium of Anaheim || L1 || bgcolor="ffbbbb" | -4
|- align="center" bgcolor="#bbffbb"
| 59 || June 8 || @ Rockies || 7–2 || Wilson (7–4) || White (2–4) || || 41,814 || 30–29 || Coors Field || W1 || bgcolor="ffbbbb" | -4
|- align="center" bgcolor="#bbffbb"
| 60 || June 9 || @ Rockies || 11–5 || Haren (4–6) || Francis (0–1) || || 37,801 || 31–29 || Coors Field || W2 || bgcolor="ffbbbb" | -3
|- align="center" bgcolor="#bbffbb"
| 61 || June 10 || @ Rockies || 10–8 || Santana (3–7) || Friedrich (4–2) || Downs (6) || 37,722 || 32–29 || Coors Field || W3 || bgcolor="ffbbbb" | -3
|- align="center" bgcolor="#bbffbb"
| 62 || June 11* || @ Dodgers || 3–2 || Isringhausen (2–0) || Jansen (4–1) || Frieri (5) || 50,559 || 33–29 || Dodger Stadium || W4 || bgcolor="ffbbbb" | -2½
|- align="center" bgcolor="ffbbbb"
| 63 || June 12* || @ Dodgers || 5–2 || Wright (3–2) || Williams (6–4) || Jansen (10) || 55,279 || 33–30 || Dodger Stadium || L1 || bgcolor="ffbbbb" | -3½
|- align="center" bgcolor="#bbffbb"
| 64 || June 13* || @ Dodgers || 2–1 || Hawkins (1–1) || Jansen (4–2) || Frieri (6) || 43,494 || 34–30 || Dodger Stadium || W1 || bgcolor="ffbbbb" | -3½
|- align="center" bgcolor="ffbbbb"
| 65 || June 15 || Diamondbacks || 5–0 || Cahill (5–5) || Haren (4–7) || || 37,096 || 34–31 || Angel Stadium of Anaheim || L1 || bgcolor="ffbbbb" | -4
|- align="center" bgcolor="#bbffbb"
| 66 || June 16 || Diamondbacks || 2–0 || Santana (4–7) || Saunders (4–5) || || 42,483 || 35–31 || Angel Stadium of Anaheim || W1 || bgcolor="ffbbbb" | -4
|- align="center" bgcolor="#bbffbb"
| 67 || June 17 || Diamondbacks || 2–0 || Richards (2–0) || Kennedy (5–7) || Frieri (7) || 42,222 || 36–31 || Angel Stadium of Anaheim || W2 || bgcolor="ffbbbb" | -4
|- align="center" bgcolor="ffbbbb"
| 68 || June 18 || Giants || 5–3 || Cain (9–2) || Williams (6–5) || Casilla (19) || 41,234 || 36–32 || Angel Stadium of Anaheim || L1 || bgcolor="ffbbbb" | -5
|- align="center" bgcolor="#bbffbb"
| 69 || June 19 || Giants || 12–5 || Wilson (8–4) || Zito (5–5) || || 38,010 || 37–32 || Angel Stadium of Anaheim || W1 || bgcolor="ffbbbb" | -5
|- align="center" bgcolor="#bbffbb"
| 70 || June 20 || Giants || 6–0 || Weaver (7–1) || Vogelsong (6–3) || || 40,321 || 38–32 || Angel Stadium of Anaheim || W2 || bgcolor="ffbbbb" | -5
|- align="center" bgcolor="#bbffbb"
| 71 || June 22* || Dodgers || 8–5 || Haren (5–7) || Billingsley (4–6) || Frieri (8) || 44,548 || 39–32 || Angel Stadium of Anaheim || W3 || bgcolor="f2f2f2" | -5
|- align="center" bgcolor="ffbbbb"
| 72 || June 23* || Dodgers || 3–1 || Capuano (9–2) || Santana (4–8) || Jansen (12) || 44,512 || 39–33 || Angel Stadium of Anaheim || L1 || bgcolor="f2f2f2" | -5
|- align="center" bgcolor="#bbffbb"
| 73 || June 24* || Dodgers || 5–3 || Downs (1–0) || Lindblom (2–2) || Frieri (9) || 43,975 || 40–33 || Angel Stadium of Anaheim || W1 || bgcolor="ffbbbb" | -5
|- align="center" bgcolor="#bbffbb"
| 74 || June 26 || @ Orioles || 7–3 || Wilson (9–4) || Matusz (5–9) || || 24,296 || 41–33 || Oriole Park at Camden Yards || W2 || bgcolor="bbcaff" | -4½
|- align="center" bgcolor="#bbffbb"
| 75 || June 27 || @ Orioles || 13–1 || Weaver (8–1) || Hammel (8–3) || || 18,055 || 42–33 || Oriole Park at Camden Yards || W3 || bgcolor="bbcaff" | -4½
|- align="center"  bgcolor="#bbffbb"
| 76 || June 28 || @ Blue Jays || 9–7 || Haren (6–7) || Cecil (1–1) || Frieri (10) || 24,668 || 43–33 || Rogers Centre || W4 || bgcolor="bbcaff" | -4½
|- align="center" bgcolor="ffbbbb"
| 77 || June 29 || @ Blue Jays || 7–5 || Cordero (3–4) || Walden (2–2) || Janssen (9) || 24,538 || 43–34 || Rogers Centre || L1 || bgcolor="bbcaff" | -5½
|- align="center" bgcolor="ffbbbb" 
| 78 || June 30 || @ Blue Jays || 11–2 || Álvarez (5–6) || Richards (2–1) || || 29,287 || 43–35 || Rogers Centre || L2 || bgcolor="bbcaff" | -6½
|-
| colspan=12 | *Freeway Series, Angels win 4–2.
|-

|- align="center" bgcolor="#bbffbb"
| 79 || July 1 || @ Blue Jays || 10–6 || Isringhausen (3–0) || Cordero (3–5) || || 34,853 || 44–35 || Rogers Centre || W1 || bgcolor="bbcaff" | -5½
|- align="center" bgcolor="#bbffbb"
| 80 || July 2 || @ Indians || 3–0 || Weaver (9–1) || Jiménez (7–7) || Downs (7) || 21,616 || 45–35 || Progressive Field || W2 || bgcolor="bbcaff" | -5
|- align="center" bgcolor="ffbbbb"  
| 81 || July 3 || @ Indians || 9–5 || McAllister (3–1) || Haren (6–8) || || 29,292 || 45–36 || Progressive Field || L1 || bgcolor="bbcaff" | -5
|- align="center" bgcolor="ffbbbb"  
| 82 || July 4 || @ Indians || 12–3 || Lowe (8–6) || Santana (4–9) || || 20,979 || 45–37 || Progressive Field || L2 || bgcolor="bbcaff" | -5
|- align="center" bgcolor="#bbffbb"
| 83 || July 5 || Orioles || 9–7 || Hawkins (2–1) || Ayala (2–2) || Frieri (11) || 38,104 || 46–37 || Angel Stadium of Anaheim || W1 || bgcolor="bbcaff" | -4
|- align="center" bgcolor="ffbbbb" 
| 84 || July 6 || Orioles || 3–2 || González (1–0) || Wilson (9–5) || Johnson (26) || 42,716 || 46–38 || Angel Stadium of Anaheim || L1 || bgcolor="bbcaff" | -4
|- align="center" bgcolor="#bbffbb"
| 85 || July 7 || Orioles || 3–0 || Weaver (10–1) || Hammel (8–5) || Downs (8) || 41,147 || 47–38 || Angel Stadium of Anaheim || W1 || bgcolor="bbcaff" | -4
|- align="center" bgcolor="#bbffbb"
| 86 || July 8 || Orioles || 6–0 || Mills (1–0) || Chen (7–5) || || 37,108 || 48–38 || Angel Stadium of Anaheim || W2 || bgcolor="bbcaff" | -4
|- align="center" bgcolor="bbcaff"
|colspan="3" bgcolor="#bbcaff"| July 10: All-Star Game (NL wins—Box) || 8–0 || Cain (SF) || Verlander (DET) ||  || 40,933 || || Kauffman Stadium || colspan=2 |  Kansas City
|- align="center" bgcolor="ffbbbb" 
| 87 || July 13 || @ Yankees || 6–5 || Qualls (2–1) || Downs (1–1) || Soriano (21) || 47,873 || 48–39 || Yankee Stadium || L1 || bgcolor="bbcaff" | -5
|- align="center" bgcolor="ffbbbb"
| 88 || July 14 || @ Yankees || 5–3 || García (4–2) || Williams (6–6) || Soriano (22) || 47,789 || 48–40 || Yankee Stadium || L2 || bgcolor="bbcaff" | -5
|- align="center" bgcolor="#bbffbb"
| 89 || July 15 || @ Yankees || 10–8 || Weaver (11–1) || Nova (10–4) || Jepsen (1) || 46,679 || 49–40 || Yankee Stadium || W1 || bgcolor="bbcaff" | -5
|- align="center" bgcolor="ffbbbb"
| 90 || July 16 || @ Tigers || 8–6 || Dotel (3–2) || Hawkins (2–2) || Valverde (17) || 36,806 || 49–41 || Comerica Park || L1 || bgcolor="bbcaff" | -5½
|- align="center" bgcolor="#bbffbb"
| 91 || July 17 || @ Tigers || 13–0 || Richards (3–1) || Turner (0–1) || || 33,950 || 50–41 || Comerica Park || W1 || bgcolor="bbcaff" | -5½
|- align="center" bgcolor="ffbbbb"
| 92 || July 18 || @ Tigers || 7–2 || Fister (4–6) || Wilson (9–6) || || 37,915 || 50–42 || Comerica Park || L1 || bgcolor="bbcaff" | -5½
|- align="center" bgcolor="ffbbbb"
| 93 || July 19 || @ Tigers || 5–1 || Scherzer (9–5) || Williams (6–7) || || 40,311 || 50–43 || Comerica Park || L2 || bgcolor="bbcaff" | -6
|- align="center" bgcolor="#bbffbb"
| 94 || July 20 || Rangers || 6–1 || Weaver (12–1) || Holland (6–5) || || 43,936 || 51–43 || Angel Stadium of Anaheim || W1 || bgcolor="bbcaff" | -5
|- align="center" bgcolor="ffbbbb"
| 95 || July 21 || Rangers || 9–2 || Darvish (11–6) || Santana (4–10) || || 39,086 || 51–44 || Angel Stadium of Anaheim || L1 || bgcolor="bbcaff" | -6
|- align="center" bgcolor="#bbffbb"
| 96 || July 22 || Rangers || 7–4 || Haren (7–8) || Harrison (12–5) || || 42,160 || 52–44 || Angel Stadium of Anaheim || W1 || bgcolor="bbcaff" | -5
|- align="center" bgcolor="#bbffbb"
| 97 || July 23 || Royals || 6–3 || Jepsen (1–1) || Holland (4–3) || Downs (9) || 35,047 || 53–44 || Angel Stadium of Anaheim || W2 || bgcolor="bbcaff" | -5
|- align="center" bgcolor="ffbbbb"
| 98 || July 24 || Royals || 4–1 || Smith (2–3) || Richards (3–2) || Broxton (23) || 35,051 || 53–45 || Angel Stadium of Anaheim || L1 || bgcolor="bbcaff" " | -5
|- align="center" bgcolor="#bbffbb"
| 99 || July 25 || Royals || 11–6 || Weaver (13–1) || Hochevar (6–9) || || 39,107 || 54–45 || Angel Stadium of Anaheim || W1 || bgcolor="bbcaff" " | -5
|- align="center" bgcolor="#bbffbb"
| 100 || July 27 || Rays || 3–1 || Haren (8–8) || Cobb (4–8) || Frieri (12) || 40,136 || 55–45 || Angel Stadium of Anaheim || W2 || bgcolor="bbcaff" | -4
|- align="center" bgcolor="ffbbbb"
| 101 || July 28 || Rays || 3–0 || Moore (7–7) || Wilson (9–7) || Rodney (29) || 41,232 || 55–46 || Angel Stadium of Anaheim || L1 || bgcolor="bbcaff" | -4 
|- align="center" bgcolor="ffbbbb"
| 102 || July 29 || Rays || 2–0 || Hellickson (6–6) || Greinke (9–4) || Rodney (30) || 35,477 || 55–47 || Angel Stadium of Anaheim || L2 || bgcolor="bbcaff" | -5
|- align="center" bgcolor="#bbffbb"
| 103 || July 30 || @ Rangers || 15–8 || Santana (5–10) || Oswalt (3–2) || Williams (1) || 36,111 || 56–47 || Rangers Ballpark in Arlington || W1 || bgcolor="bbcaff" | -4
|- align="center" bgcolor="#bbffbb"
| 104 || July 31 || @ Rangers || 6–2 || Weaver (14–1) || Holland (7–6) || || 34,918 || 57–47 || Rangers Ballpark in Arlington || W2 || bgcolor="bbcaff" | -3
|-

|- align="center" bgcolor="ffbbbb"
| 105 || August 1 || @ Rangers || 11–10 (10) || Nathan (2–3) || Isringhausen (3–1) || || 42,832 || 57–48 || Rangers Ballpark in Arlington ||L1 || bgcolor="bbcaff" | -4
|- align="center" bgcolor="ffbbbb"
| 106 || August 2 || @ Rangers || 15–9 || Oswalt (4–2) || Carpenter (1–2) || || 40,281 || 57–49 || Rangers Ballpark in Arlington ||L2 || bgcolor="ffbbbb" | -5
|- align="center" bgcolor="ffbbbb"
| 107 || August 3 || @ White Sox || 8–6 (10) || Thornton (4–6) || Takahashi (0–3) || || 32,060 || 57–50 || U.S. Cellular Field ||L3 || bgcolor="ffbbbb" | -6
|- align="center" bgcolor="#bbffbb"
| 108 || August 4 || @ White Sox || 6–5 (10) || Jepsen (2–1) || Thornton (4–7) || Frieri (13) || 28,571 || 58–50 || U.S. Cellular Field || W1 || bgcolor="ffbbbb" | -6
|- align="center" bgcolor="ffbbbb"
| 109 || August 5 || @ White Sox || 4–2 || Jones (5–0) || Isringhausen (3–2) || Reed (19) || 30,202 || 58–51 || U.S. Cellular Field || L1 || bgcolor="ffbbbb" | -6
|- align="center" bgcolor="#bbffbb"
| 110 || August 6 || @ Athletics || 4–0 || Weaver (15–1) || Parker (7–6) || || 13,341 || 59–51 || O.co Coliseum || W1 || bgcolor="bbcaff" | -5
|- align="center" bgcolor="ffbbbb"
| 111 || August 7 || @ Athletics || 10–4 || Colón (9–8) || Wilson (9–8) || || 15,458 || 59–52 || O.co Coliseum || L1 || bgcolor="ffbbbb" | -6
|- align="center" bgcolor="ffbbbb"
| 112 || August 8 || @ Athletics || 9–8 || Neshek (1–0) || Hawkins (2–3) || Cook (12) || 21,150 || 59–53 || O.co Coliseum || L2 || bgcolor="ffbbbb" | -7
|- align="center" bgcolor="#bbffbb"
| 113 || August 10 || Mariners || 6–5 || Frieri (2–0) || Kinney (0–2) || || 39,016 || 60–53 || Angel Stadium of Anaheim || W1 || bgcolor="ffbbbb" | -6
|- align="center" bgcolor="ffbbbb"
| 114 || August 11 || Mariners || 7–4 || Iwakuma (3–3) || Haren (8–9) || || 38,722 || 60–54 || Angel Stadium of Anaheim || L1 || bgcolor="ffbbbb" | -7
|- align="center" bgcolor="ffbbbb"
| 115 || August 12 || Mariners || 4–1 || Vargas (13–8) || Weaver (15–2) || Wilhelmsen (16) || 36,505 || 60–55 || Angel Stadium of Anaheim || L2 || bgcolor="ffbbbb" | -8
|- align="center" bgcolor="ffbbbb"
| 116 || August 13 || Indians || 6–2 || Masterson (9–10) || Wilson (9–9) || Perez (32) || 36,620 || 60–56 || Angel Stadium of Anaheim || L3 || bgcolor="ffbbbb" | -8
|- align="center" bgcolor="#bbffbb"
| 117 || August 14 || Indians || 9–6 || Greinke (10–4) || Jiménez (9–12) || Frieri (14) || 39,827 || 61–56 || Angel Stadium of Anaheim || W1 || bgcolor="ffbbbb" | -7
|- align="center" bgcolor="#bbffbb"
| 118 || August 15 || Indians || 8–4 || Santana (6–10) || Hernández (0–1) || || 37,554 || 62–56 || Angel Stadium of Anaheim || W2 || bgcolor="ffbbbb" | -6
|- align="center" bgcolor="ffbbbb"
| 119 || August 16 || Rays || 7–0 || Price (16–4) || Haren (8–10) || || 38,591 || 62–57 || Angel Stadium of Anaheim || L1 || bgcolor="ffbbbb" | -7
|- align="center" bgcolor="ffbbbb"
| 120 || August 17 || Rays || 12–3 || Shields (11–7) || Weaver (15–3) || || 37,298 || 62–58 || Angel Stadium of Anaheim || L2 || bgcolor="ffbbbb" | -7
|- align="center" bgcolor="ffbbbb"
| 121 || August 18 || Rays || 10–8 || McGee (4–2) || Jepsen (2–2) || Rodney (38) || 41,086 || 62–59 || Angel Stadium of Anaheim || L3 || bgcolor="ffbbbb" | -8
|- align="center" bgcolor="ffbbbb"
| 122 || August 19 || Rays || 8–3 || Moore (10–7) || Greinke (10–5) || || 36,789 || 62–60 || Angel Stadium of Anaheim || L4 || bgcolor="ffbbbb" | -9
|- align="center" bgcolor="#bbffbb"
| 123 || August 21 || @ Red Sox || 5–3 || Santana (7–10) || Cook (3–7) || Frieri (15) || 37,794 || 63–60 || Fenway Park || W1 || bgcolor="ffbbbb" | -8½
|- align="center" bgcolor="#bbffbb" 
| 124 || August 22 || @ Red Sox || 7–3 || Weaver (16–3) || Buchholz (11–4) || || 37,373 || 64–60 || Fenway Park || W2 || bgcolor="ffbbbb" | -8½
|- align="center" bgcolor="#bbffbb" 
| 125 || August 23 || @ Red Sox || 14–13 (10) || Frieri (3–0) || Aceves (2–8) || || 37,829 || 65–60 || Fenway Park || W3 || bgcolor="ffbbbb" | -8½
|- align="center" bgcolor="#bbffbb"  
| 126 || August 24 || @ Tigers || 2–1 || Greinke (11–5) || Porcello (9–9) || Richards (1) || 39,356 || 66–60 || Comerica Park || W4 || bgcolor="ffbbbb" | -8½
|- align="center" bgcolor="ffbbbb" 
| 127 || August 25 || @ Tigers || 5–3 || Dotel (4–2) || Richards (3–3) || Valverde (26) || 41,970 || 66–61 || Comerica Park || L1 || bgcolor="ffbbbb" | -9½
|- align="center" bgcolor="ffbbbb" 
| 128 || August 26 || @ Tigers || 5–2 || Scherzer (14–6) || Santana (7–11) || || 40,074 || 66–62 || Comerica Park || L2 || bgcolor="ffbbbb" | -9½
|- align="center" bgcolor="#bbffbb"
| 129 || August 28 || Red Sox || 6–5 || Jepsen (3–2) || Aceves (2–9) || || 38,745 || 67–62 || Angel Stadium of Anaheim || W1 || bgcolor="ffbbbb" | -10
|- align="center" bgcolor="#bbffbb"
| 130 || August 29 || Red Sox || 10–3 || Wilson (10–9) || Stewart (1–3) || || 37,841 || 68–62 || Angel Stadium of Anaheim || W2 || bgcolor="ffbbbb" | -9
|- align="center" bgcolor="#bbffbb"
| 131 || August 30 || Red Sox || 5–2 || Greinke (12–5) || Lester (8–11) || Frieri (16) || 39,013 || 69–62 || Angel Stadium of Anaheim || W3 || bgcolor="ffbbbb" | -8½
|- align="center" bgcolor="#bbffbb"
| 132 || August 31 || @ Mariners || 9–1 || Haren (9–10) || Millwood (4–12) || || 17,739 || 70–62 || Safeco Field || W4 || bgcolor="ffbbbb" | -8½
|-

|- align="center" bgcolor="#bbffbb"
| 133 || September 1 || @ Mariners || 5–2 || Santana (8–11) || Hernández (13–6) || Frieri (17) || 22,910 || 71–62 || Safeco Field || W5 || bgcolor="ffbbbb" | -7½
|- align="center" bgcolor="ffbbbb"
| 134 || September 2 || @ Mariners || 2–1 || Iwakuma (6–3) || Weaver (16–4) || Wilhelmsen (22) || 20,584 || 71–63 || Safeco Field || L1 || bgcolor="ffbbbb" | -8½
|- align="center" bgcolor="#bbffbb"
| 135 || September 3 || @ Athletics || 8–3 || Wilson (11–9) || Milone (11–10) || || 20,180 || 72–63 || O.co Coliseum || W1 || bgcolor="ffbbbb" | -8½
|- align="center" bgcolor="#bbffbb"
| 136 || September 4 || @ Athletics || 6–1 || Greinke (13–5) || Parker (9–8) || || 11,688 || 73–63 || O.co Coliseum || W2 || bgcolor="ffbbbb" | -7½
|- align="center" bgcolor="#bbffbb" 
| 137 || September 5 || @ Athletics || 7–1 || Haren (10–10) || McCarthy (8–6) || || 15,404 || 74–63 || O.co Coliseum || W3 || bgcolor="ffbbbb" | -7½
|- align="center" bgcolor="#bbffbb"
| 138 || September 7 || Tigers || 3–2 || Frieri (4–0) || Dotel (5–3) || || 40,104 || 75–63 || Angel Stadium of Anaheim || W4 || bgcolor="ffbbbb" | -7
|- align="center" bgcolor="#bbffbb"
| 139 || September 8 || Tigers || 6–1 || Wilson (12–9) || Verlander (13–8) || || 41,154 || 76–63 || Angel Stadium of Anaheim || W5 || bgcolor="ffbbbb" | -7
|- align="center" bgcolor="#bbffbb"
| 140 || September 9 || Tigers || 3–2 || Greinke (14–5) || Sánchez (7–12) || Frieri (18) || 38,216 || 77–63 || Angel Stadium of Anaheim || W6 || bgcolor="ffbbbb" | -6
|- align="center" bgcolor="ffbbbb"
| 141 || September 10 || Athletics || 3–1 || Parker (10–8) || Haren (10–11) || Balfour (17) || 36,064 || 77–64 || Angel Stadium of Anaheim || L1 || bgcolor="ffbbbb" | -6½
|- align="center" bgcolor="ffbbbb"
| 142 || September 11 || Athletics || 6–5 || Straily (2–0) || Williams (6–8) || Blevins (1) || 37,794 || 77–65 || Angel Stadium of Anaheim || L2 || bgcolor="ffbbbb" | -7½
|- align="center" bgcolor="ffbbbb"
| 143 || September 12 || Athletics || 4–1 || Griffin (6–0) || Santana (8–12) || Cook (14) || 38,097 || 77–66 || Angel Stadium of Anaheim || L3 || bgcolor="ffbbbb" | -8½
|- align="center" bgcolor="#bbffbb"
| 144 || September 13 || Athletics || 6–0 || Weaver (17–4) || Anderson (4–1) || || 38,029 || 78–66 || Angel Stadium of Anaheim || W1 || bgcolor="ffbbbb" | -7½
|- align="center" bgcolor="#bbffbb"
| 145 || September 14 || @ Royals || 9–7 || Walden (3–2) || Collins (5–3) || Frieri (19) || 27,586 || 79–66 || Kauffman Stadium || W2 || bgcolor="ffbbbb" | -7½
|- align="center" bgcolor="ffbbbb"
| 146 || September 15 || @ Royals || 3–2 || Herrera (4–2) || Frieri (4–1) || || 23,027 || 79–67 || Kauffman Stadium || L1 || bgcolor="ffbbbb" | -7½
|- align="center" bgcolor="#bbffbb"
| 147 || September 16 || @ Royals || 4–3 || Haren (11–11) || Smith (5–8) || Jepsen (2) || 24,979 || 80–67 || Kauffman Stadium || W1 || bgcolor="ffbbbb" | -7½
|- align="center" bgcolor="#bbffbb"
| 148 || September 18 || Rangers || 11–3 || Weaver (18–4) || Dempster (11–7) || || 36,948 || 81–67 || Angel Stadium of Anaheim || W2 || bgcolor="ffbbbb" | -6½
|- align="center" bgcolor="ffbbbb"
| 149 || September 19 || Rangers || 6–2 || Holland (11–6) || Wilson (12–10) || || 37,093 || 81–68 || Angel Stadium of Anaheim || L1 || bgcolor="ffbbbb" | -7½
|- align="center" bgcolor="ffbbbb"
| 150 || September 20 || Rangers || 3–1 || Darvish (16–9) || Frieri (4–2) || Nathan (34) || 38,205 || 81–69 || Angel Stadium of Anaheim || L2 || bgcolor="ffbbbb" | -8½
|- align="center" bgcolor="#bbffbb"
| 151 || September 21 || White Sox || 6–2 || Santana (9–12) || Peavy (11–12) || || 39,326 || 82–69 || Angel Stadium of Anaheim || W1 || bgcolor="ffbbbb" | -7½
|- align="center" bgcolor="#bbffbb"
| 152 || September 22 || White Sox || 4–2 || Haren (12–11) || Quintana (6–5) || Frieri (20) || 41,440 || 83–69 || Angel Stadium of Anaheim || W2 || bgcolor="ffbbbb" | -6½
|- align="center" bgcolor="#bbffbb"
| 153 || September 23 || White Sox || 4–1 || Weaver (19–4) || Floyd (10–11) || || 36,546 || 84–69 || Angel Stadium of Anaheim || W3 || bgcolor="ffbbbb" | -6½
|- align="center" bgcolor="#bbffbb"
| 154 || September 25 || Mariners || 5–4 || Greinke (15–5) || Ramírez (1–3) || Frieri (21) || 38,538 || 85–69 || Angel Stadium of Anaheim || W4 || bgcolor="ffbbbb" | -6
|- align="center" bgcolor="#bbffbb"
| 155 || September 26 || Mariners || 4–3 || Frieri (5–2) || Pryor (3–1) || || 37,916 || 86–69 || Angel Stadium of Anaheim || W5 || bgcolor="ffbbbb" | -5
|- align="center" bgcolor="ffbbbb"
| 156 || September 27 || Mariners || 9–4 || Iwakuma (8–5)  || Haren (12–12) || || 37,377 || 86–70 || Angel Stadium of Anaheim || L1 || bgcolor="ffbbbb" | -6
|- align="center" bgcolor="#bbffbb"
| 157 || September 28 || @ Rangers || 7–4 || Weaver (20–4) || Dempster (12–8) || Frieri (22) || 46,662 || 87–70 || Rangers Ballpark in Arlington || W1 || bgcolor="ffbbbb" | -5
|- align="center" bgcolor="#bbffbb" 
| 158 || September 30 || @ Rangers || 5–4 || Richards (4–3) || Nathan (3–5) || Frieri (23) || 46,713 || 88–70 || Rangers Ballpark in Arlington || W2 || bgcolor="ffbbbb" | -4
|- align="center" bgcolor="ffbbbb"
| 159 || September 30 || @ Rangers || 8–7 || Holland (12–6) || Santana (9–13) || Nathan (37) || 48,089 || 88–71 || Rangers Ballpark in Arlington || L1 || bgcolor="ffbbbb" | -5
|- align="center" bgcolor="#bbffbb" 
| 160 || October 1 || @ Mariners || 8–4 || Wilson (13–10) || Hernández (13–9) || || 13,963 || 89–71 || Safeco Field || W1 || bgcolor="ffbbbb" | -4
|- align="center" bgcolor="ffbbbb"
| 161 || October 2 || @ Mariners || 6–1 || Iwakuma (9–5) || Haren (12–13) || || 14,353 || 89–72 || Safeco Field || L1 || bgcolor="ffbbbb" | -4
|- align="center" bgcolor="ffbbbb"
| 162 || October 3 || @ Mariners || 12–0 || Beavan (11–11) || Weaver (20–5) || || 15,614 || 89–73 || Safeco Field || L2 || bgcolor="ffbbbb" | -5
|-

Regular Season Schedule (calendar style) 
Regular Season Schedule (sortable text)

Standings

Season standings

American League West

American League Wild Card

Record vs. opponents

Roster

Farm system

See also

Los Angeles Angels of Anaheim
Angel Stadium of Anaheim

References

External links
2012 Los Angeles Angels of Anaheim Official Site
2012 Los Angeles Angels of Anaheim season at Baseball Reference

Los Angeles Angels seasons
Los Angeles Angels of Anaheim
Los